The PlusLiga is the highest level of men's volleyball in Poland, a professional league competition featuring volleyball clubs located in this country. It is overseen by Polska Liga Siatkówki SA (PLS SA). It is currently a 16 teams league from October to April/May. The regular season is followed by playoffs, with the winner earning the Polish Championship. It is one of the best volleyball leagues in Europe, being highly ranked in the international competitions.

Champions
Polish Volleyball Championship

Polish Volleyball League (Klasa wydzielona, Ekstraklasa, 1 liga Seria A)

Polish Professional Volleyball League (Polish Volleyball League, PlusLiga)

Teams

 The following teams compete in the PlusLiga during the 2022–23 season:

Total titles won

See also
 Polish Men's Volleyball Cup
 Polish Men's Volleyball SuperCup

References

External links

 PlusLiga official website 
 Polish Volleyball Federation website 

PlusLiga
Volleyball competitions in Poland
Poland
Sports leagues established in 2000
Professional sports leagues in Poland